A Taste of Honey is a 1961 British film adaptation of the 1958 play of the same name by Shelagh Delaney. Delaney wrote the screenplay with director Tony Richardson, who had directed the play on the stage. It is an exemplar of a gritty genre of British film that has come to be called kitchen sink realism.

The film opened on 15 September 1961 at the Leicester Square Theatre in London's West End.

Plot 
The film starts with girls playing a game of netball in a school playground. Jo and her mother then move across Manchester on a bus.

The story is set in a run-down, post-industrial area of Salford. Jo (Rita Tushingham) is a 17-year-old schoolgirl with a self-centred, promiscuous, alcoholic mother, Helen (Dora Bryan). The two of them frequently argue, and rarely stay in one home for long, since the mother runs up rent arrears, and is either evicted, or elects to abandon the property without settling any debts.

As they move into a shabby new flat, a young black sailor called Jimmy (Paul Danquah) sees Jo struggling with her suitcases and gives her some help. Helen brings a new man home after a night in the pub but her love life is curtailed because she has to share a bed with Jo.

A while later Jo badly grazes her knee in a fall as she is walking home from school. Limping along, she goes past the Manchester Ship Canal, where Jimmy happens to be coming off his ship. He sees Jo and invites her onboard to attend to her knee. They go dancing and on the return to his ship they kiss for the first time. This turns out to be the start of a brief romantic relationship, but Jimmy's ship soon sails and they part. Relations between Jo and her mother become further strained when her mother courts Peter Smith (Robert Stephens). Jo trails after them on a weekend in Blackpool. Peter gives Helen an ultimatum saying she must choose him or Jo and she sends Jo home alone. Helen remarries and moves to a suburban bungalow with Peter and leaves Jo to fend for herself. Jimmy is waiting when she returns to Salford and they spend a night together before he boards his ship in the morning. She watches him sail off.

Rejected by her mother, Jo leaves school, starts a job in a shoe shop and rents accommodation in an old workshop on her own. She meets a gay textile design student, Geoffrey Ingham (Murray Melvin), and invites him to live with her. Together they make the workshop more liveable. When Jo discovers she is pregnant by Jimmy, Geof is supportive, even offering to marry her, saying "You need somebody to love you while you're looking for somebody to love".

With Jo heavily pregnant, Geof tracks down Helen and tells her Jo is pregnant. Within minutes of reuniting the two of them have a row - calling each other whores. Helen offers Jo her home but Jo declines. However, after a few weeks her mother reappears - by now her rocky marriage has broken down and, ever needy, she is intent on moving in with Jo and pushing out Geof, with whom she has a shouting match. Geof leaves quietly. Helen says Geof has just popped out.

Despite her best instincts, Jo is amenable to her mother staying - with the birth imminent she has become frightened and feels a need for female company and know-how. She begrudgingly agrees to her mother moving in, but only on the basis that Geof remains. While Jo sleeps, however, Geof decides he can no longer stay at the workshop, and with Helen looking on approvingly, packs his bags and leaves a goodbye note for Jo. When Jo wakes up, she finds Geof has gone and she goes outside in the hope of catching him but sees only her mother, returning from the off-licence with some bottles of beer. Geof is seen hiding in the shadows beneath the stairs. He is hoping to have a chance to talk to Jo alone, but, seeing Helen returning, he is crestfallen and walks off. The film ends with Jo standing in the street watching a group of children singing "The Big Ship Sails on the Alley Alley Oh", and because it is bonfire night, a small child gives her a sparkler.

Cast 
 Rita Tushingham as Jo
 Dora Bryan as Helen
 Robert Stephens as Peter Smith
 Murray Melvin as Geoffrey Ingham
 Paul Danquah as Jimmy
 Margo Cunningham as Landlady (uncredited)
 Michael Bilton as Landlord (uncredited)
 Hazel Blears and Stephen Blears as street urchins (uncredited)

Reception
A. H. Weiler of The New York Times gave a positive review, stating "In being transported out of the theatre, this "Honey" has been enriched."

Tushingham said in 2020  "A lot of the reaction was 'People like that don’t exist' – by which they meant homosexuals, single mothers and people in mixed-race relationships. But they did." The film was banned in several countries.

Awards and honours 
The film won four BAFTA awards: Delaney and Richardson won Best British Screenplay, and the film Best British Film. Bryan won Best Actress and Tushingham was named Most Promising Newcomer.

Tushingham and Melvin won Best Actress and Actor at the 1962 Cannes Film Festival.

In spite of dealing with several topics then rarely touched on in Hollywood movies, the film won Tushingham a 1962 Golden Globe for Most Promising Female Newcomer, and Richardson recived a nomination for the 1962 Directors Guild of America awards. Delaney and Richardson also won a Writers' Guild of Great Britain award.

A Taste of Honey was ranked at 56th place in the BFI Top 100 British films list, made in 1999.

Release

Box office
The film made a profit of £29,064 for Bryanston Films.

Home media
The Criterion Collection released a restored 4K digital transfer of the film on Blu-ray and DVD on 23 August 2016.

References

External links 
 
 
 
 
 A Taste of Honey: Northern Accents an essay by Colin MacCabe at the Criterion Collection

1961 films
1961 romantic drama films
1961 LGBT-related films
Best British Film BAFTA Award winners
British black-and-white films
British films based on plays
British romantic drama films
British LGBT-related films
British Lion Films films
1960s English-language films
Films about alcoholism
Films about dysfunctional families
Films about interracial romance
Films directed by Tony Richardson
Films scored by John Addison
Films set in Lancashire
Salford
Social realism in film
Teenage pregnancy in film
Censored films
Films shot in Greater Manchester
1960s British films